Baikal Amur Corrective Labor Camp (Bamlag) was a subdivision of GULAG which existed during 1932-1948.

Its administration, headed by Naftaly Frenkel (1933-1938), was headquartered in the settlement of Svobodny, Amur Oblast.

Its main activity was construction of the Baikal Amur Mainline and secondary railroad branches. Its peak headcount was about 201,000 (1938). In 1938 it was dismantled into several camps.

Notable convicts
Pavel Florensky, Russian Orthodox theologian and philosopher
Konstantin Rokossovsky, Soviet  marshal, and "Polish" Defense Minister

See also

Amurlag (1938—1941)

References

Camps of the Gulag
History of Amur Oblast
History of the Russian Far East
1932 in the Soviet Union